Cassius Lee Marsh Sr. (born July 7, 1992) is an American football outside linebacker who is a free agent. He was drafted by the Seattle Seahawks in the fourth round of the 2014 NFL Draft. He played college football at UCLA. He has also played for the New England Patriots, San Francisco 49ers, Arizona Cardinals, Jacksonville Jaguars, Indianapolis Colts, Pittsburgh Steelers and Chicago Bears.

Early life
Marsh attended Oaks Christian School in Westlake Village, California. He was a member of PrepStar Dream Team and Tacoma News-Tribune Western 100. He was ranked as 22nd defensive tackle prospect nationally by Tom Lemming/MaxPreps during high school. He was selected to the GoldenStatePreps.com All-State first-team and All-SoCal first-team. He was named CIF-SS All-Northwest Division co-Defensive Player of the Year in his junior season. He played in the U.S. Army All-America Game after high school. He recorded 83 tackles, 23 sacks, in his senior season at high school.

Rivals rated Marsh as a four-star prospect being the No. 4 defensive tackle, No. 6 prospect in the state of California, and the No. 33 prospect overall regardless of position. ESPN recruiting rated Marsh as a three-star prospect being the No. 33 defensive tackle, and the No. 33 prospect in the state of California. 247 rated Cassius as a four-star prospect being the No. 11 defensive tackle, and the No. 142 overall prospect (No. 114 composite ranking) regardless of position. SCOUT rated Cassius as a four-star prospect as well. Many major college programs offered scholarships and, after committing to LSU, Marsh changed his mind and committed to UCLA so he would be closer to home.

College career
In December 2010, he was selected to the Rivals.com Pac-10 All-Freshman team in his freshman season. He was winner of UCLA's John Boncheff Jr. Memorial Award for Rookie of the Year in his freshman season.

Professional career

Seattle Seahawks

Marsh was drafted by the Seattle Seahawks in the fourth round, 108th overall, in the 2014 NFL Draft. He was signed to a four-year contract on May 19, 2014. Marsh recorded the first sack and first forced fumble of his NFL career against the Miami Dolphins in the season opener on September 11, 2016.

New England Patriots
On September 2, 2017, the Seahawks traded Marsh to the New England Patriots in exchange for the Patriots' fifth- and seventh-round selections in the 2018 NFL Draft. Week 1 on September 7 against Kansas City his blown coverage resulted in a 78-yard Kareem Hunt touchdown reception. On October 22, he blocked a field goal in a game versus the Atlanta Falcons. On November 21 the Patriots waived Marsh. Marsh has since expressed criticism of Belichick's coaching methods. A report in 2018 said that Marsh had a locker room “tirade” and temper tantrum over playing time at halftime when the Patriots were leading 17–0 in Mexico City versus the Raiders. He was released two days later.

San Francisco 49ers
Marsh was claimed off waivers by the San Francisco 49ers a day after being released by the Patriots. On February 7, 2018, Marsh signed a two-year contract extension with the 49ers.

In 2018, Marsh played in 16 games with three starts, recording a career-high 38 combined tackles and 5.5 sacks.

On March 15, 2019, Marsh was released by the 49ers.

Seattle Seahawks (second stint)
On April 4, 2019, Marsh signed with the Seattle Seahawks. He was released on August 31, 2019.

Arizona Cardinals
On September 1, 2019, Marsh signed with the Arizona Cardinals.

Jacksonville Jaguars
Marsh signed with the Jacksonville Jaguars on April 6, 2020. He was released on October 15, 2020.

Indianapolis Colts
On October 24, 2020, Marsh was signed to the Indianapolis Colts' practice squad. He was elevated to the active roster on November 12, November 21, and November 28 for the team's weeks 10, 11, and 12 games against the Tennessee Titans, Green Bay Packers, and Titans, and reverted to the practice squad after each game.

Pittsburgh Steelers
On December 9, 2020, Marsh was signed by the Pittsburgh Steelers off the Colts' practice squad. He was placed on the reserve/COVID-19 list by the team on January 2, 2021, and activated five days later.

On March 24, 2021, Marsh was re-signed by the Steelers to a one-year contract. He was released on August 31, 2021.

Chicago Bears
On November 3, 2021, Marsh was signed to the Chicago Bears practice squad. On November 19, 2021, Marsh was signed to the active roster. He was placed on injured reserve on December 10.

Personal life

Marsh is the son of Curtis Marsh Sr. and the half-brother of Curtis Marsh Jr. Marsh's father, a wide receiver who played college football at Utah, was drafted in the seventh round of the 1995 NFL Draft by the Jacksonville Jaguars. Curtis Sr. played two seasons for the Jaguars and one for the Pittsburgh Steelers before going to the Canadian Football League, where he was an All-Star in 2000. Curtis Jr. played college football at Utah State; he was a running back for the 2007 and 2008 seasons before moving to defensive back for the 2009 and 2010 seasons. Curtis Jr. was selected in the third round of the 2011 NFL Draft by the Philadelphia Eagles.

Marsh is an avid Magic: The Gathering player and owns decks whose total value was more than $20,000. He also co-founded and co-owns the local game store Cash Cards Unlimited with his business partner Nick Nugwynne where he sells trading card game and hobby products.

Marsh was also one of the first investors in popular video gifting app Cameo.

References

External links
UCLA bio

1992 births
Living people
American football defensive ends
Arizona Cardinals players
American Magic: The Gathering players
Chicago Bears players
Indianapolis Colts players
Jacksonville Jaguars players
New England Patriots players
People from Mission Hills, Santa Barbara County, California
Pittsburgh Steelers players
Players of American football from California
San Francisco 49ers players
Seattle Seahawks players
Sportspeople from Santa Barbara County, California
UCLA Bruins football players